Malleostemon costatus is a plant species of the family Myrtaceae endemic to Western Australia.

It is found in the two locations; one in the Wheatbelt region of Western Australia near Coorow and the other in the  Mid West near Northampton where it grows in sandy soils.

References

costatus
Flora of Western Australia
Plants described in 2016
Taxa named by Barbara Lynette Rye
Taxa named by Malcolm Eric Trudgen